The 1990 California Attorney General election was held on November 6, 1990. Republican nominee Dan Lungren narrowly defeated Democratic nominee Arlo Smith with 46.77% of the vote.

Primary elections
Primary elections were held on June 5, 1990.

Democratic primary

Candidates
Arlo Smith, District Attorney of San Francisco
Ira Reiner, Los Angeles County District Attorney

Results

Republican primary

Candidates
Dan Lungren, former U.S. Representative

Results

General election

Candidates
Major party candidates
Dan Lungren, Republican
Arlo Smith, Democratic

Other candidates
Paul N. Gautreau, Libertarian
Robert J. Evans, Peace and Freedom

Results

References

1990
Attorney General
California